Cirsonella globosa is a species of sea snail, a marine gastropod mollusk in the family Skeneidae, the turban snails.

References

External links
 To Encyclopedia of Life
 To World Register of Marine Species

globosa
Gastropods described in 1903